Víctor Rogelio Ramos (born 4 September 1958 in Rosario) is an Argentine former football striker. He played club football in Argentina and France and represented the Argentina national football team. He spent the majority of his career with Newell's Old Boys, where he holds the record as the club's top scorer with 104 goals.

Ramos started his professional career in 1978 with Newell's, he soon established himself as a first team player, scoring his first goal for the club on July 8, 1979 against Huracán. He went on to score 104 goals for the club including 30 in Metropolitano 1983, to become the leagues topscorer.

Ramos was included in the Argentina squad for Copa América 1983. He played a total of 10 games for his country, scoring one goal.

In 1985 Ramos moved to France where he played for Nantes and Toulon before returning to Argentina in 1987.

Ramos was part of the Newell's Old Boys team that won the 1987–88 championship. He continued playing for the club until 1989.

In the latter years of his playing career Ramos played for Nueva Chicago and  Unión de Santa Fe, retiring in 1991.

Honours
 Newell's Old Boys
Primera División Argentina: 1987–88

External links
Newell's Old Boys top scorers 

1958 births
Living people
Footballers from Rosario, Santa Fe
Argentine footballers
Association football forwards
Argentina international footballers
1983 Copa América players
Newell's Old Boys footballers
FC Nantes players
SC Toulon players
Nueva Chicago footballers
Unión de Santa Fe footballers
Argentine Primera División players
Ligue 1 players
Argentine expatriate footballers
Expatriate footballers in France
Argentine expatriate sportspeople in France